The Pakistan Coast Guards (abbreviation: PCG) is a maritime law enforcement agency of the Civil Armed Forces of Pakistan. It is managed and controlled by the Pakistan Army, with a mission of riverine operations and coastal operations including conducting anti-narcotics missions, anti-human trafficking, illegal immigration through the coastal areas, and anti-smuggling initiatives.

The Coast Guards should not be confused with the Pakistan Maritime Security Agency (MSA), which is a coast guard run by the Pakistan Navy. The MSA conducts search and rescue operations at sea and helps to defend the coastal areas while conducting military operations for maritime law enforcement in national and international waters.

History

From 1947–60s, the Pakistan Customs had the law enforcement responsibility for the defense of land and sea based frontiers of Pakistan with the objective to prevent smuggling of contraband items into and from Pakistan. In 1971, the headquarters of the Coast Guard was established in Karachi with Pakistan Army's Brigadier Sajjad Husain becoming its first director-general.

Its constitutional status was granted through the Parliamentary procedures in 1972 and became a federal law enforcement agency in 1973 while remaining a branch with the Army. The Pakistan Coast Guards are responsible for maintaining the constitutional law at the Pakistan's beaches and patrolling the riverine platforms while the combat sea-based search and rescue missions, enforcement of admiralty law in the international waters, and preventing the armed piracy falls under the responsibility of the Maritime Security Agency (MSA).

Since then, it has upgraded its facilities and fleet to bolster its capabilities of littoral patrolling of the coast line. The Army's Coast Guard is headed by an appointed Brigadier who is formally known as Director General. The officers of the Force are seconded from the Army and Navy for a period of two to three years, while the troops are permanent. In addition to land based troops, the Coast Guards also maintains a small fleet of patrol boats to perform its sea-borne duties, although the operations in deep water and dangerous undertaking are conducted by its counterpart Maritime Security Agency (MSA) of Pakistan Navy.

The exact number of personnel and equipment held with Coast Guards remains classified. The Pakistan Coast Guards works under administrative control of Ministry of Interior in peace time whereas it will come under operational control of Pakistan Army in wartime situations.

The Organization

Headquarters and   Battalions
The Headquarters with its complements and PCG Hospital.

PCG Battalions are led by commandants with the rank  of lieutenant colonel, appointment coming from the Army.  The Battalions are located as follows:
 1st Battalion, Pasni,.
 2nd Battalion, Gwadar.
 3rd Battalion, Korangi.
 4th Battalion, Uthal.
 Field Intelligence Unit

The battalions are each subdivided into 3-4 companies (commanded by majors/captains seconded from the Army).

Interior Ministry support
 50 Aviation Squadron

Marine Wing
Pakistan Coast Guards as a whole is spread all over to safeguard coastal belt of 1050 km as well as up to 12 NM Territorial Waters of Pakistan. Marine Wing of PCG is entrusted with the responsibility of 12 NM of territorial waters.  The Marine Wing is based at Karachi and commanded by a commander of operation branch, seconded from Pakistan Navy. MW is equipped with Fast Patrol Crafts, lethal Interceptor Boats and other Utility Boats with latest equipment on board.  MW has full facility to train its men in the relevant fields and able to conduct general and technical cadres. Marine Wing PCG has also established Search and Rescue Centre to safe the precious life in distress and to prevent property loss or damage.

Mounted Infantry Troop
AT Coy is based in Korangi with a Training Wing and is responsible for maintaining horses, camels and cattle for use in the field, as well as a dog section. It is commanded by a seconded captain from the Remount, Veterinary and Farm Corps (RV&FC) of the Army.

Ranks

Roles of PCG

Anti-smuggling
To keep a check on smugglers and stop their activities of smuggling (inbound as well as outbound) through the sea routes. PCG Battalions have special check posts all along the coastal belt and also pickets the threatened areas randomly.  In addition, The Intelligence Wing has a network of agents and informers and establish pickets in consultation with Commandants of the PCG Battalions when a potential smuggling activity is reported to take place. PCG has been equipped with modern communication and surveillance equipment; including radars, to perform this task.

Human Trafficking
The Pakistan Coast Guard has in recent years, undertaken greater operations against drug & weapon and even human trafficking/smuggler networks operating in the coastal waters.

Counter Narcotics
PCG is responsible for narcotics control along Pakistan's coastline.

Fleet
Fast Patrol Boats (FPB)s - including Rigid inflatable boats
Interceptor Boats (IB)s
Speed Boats  (SB)s

PCG Air Wing

 Bell 412
 Jet Ranger

See also 
 Pakistan Maritime Security Agency
 Law enforcement in Pakistan

References

External links 
 
 Ministry of Defence Website

Riverine warfare
Federal law enforcement agencies of Pakistan
1971 establishments in Pakistan
Government agencies established in 1971
Military in Sindh
Military in Balochistan, Pakistan
Civil Armed Forces